Modesta Vžesniauskaitė (born 17 October 1983 in Panevėžys) is a female road racing cyclist from Lithuania, who represented her nation at the 2008 Summer Olympics in Beijing. She competed in the women's road race, and completed the run in twenty-seventh place, with a time of 3:33:17.

Career achievements
 2004 World Road Championships – 5th place
 2004 Giro d'Italia Femminile – 5th place
 2005 European under-23 Championships – 3rd place
 2005 Giro di San Marino – 1st place
 2008 Summer Olympics – 27th place
 2008 Lithuanian National Road Championships – 1st place
 Present - Charity Ambassador for Caudwell Children

Personal life
Vžesniauskaitė's current partner is English billionaire John Caudwell. Their son William was born in March 2021. Modesta's first son, Leonardo, was born February 2012.

References

External links

Profile – LDSF 
Profile – Team Colavita
NBC 2008 Olympics profile

1983 births
Living people
Sportspeople from Panevėžys
Lithuanian female cyclists
Cyclists at the 2008 Summer Olympics
Olympic cyclists of Lithuania